Hirohide (written: , ,  or ) is a masculine Japanese given name. Notable people with the name include:

, Japanese footballer
, Imperial Japanese Navy officer
, Japanese automotive engineer
, Japanese samurai
, Japanese politician

Japanese masculine given names